Sony Rox HD was an Indian HD pay-TV music channel owned by Sony Pictures Networks (subsidiary of Sony Pictures Entertainment). The channel was launched on 16 January 2017 and its programming focuses on the broadcast of 2010s onwards recent Hindi-language musical videos. Sony Rox was discontinued by SPNI w.e.f 31 December 2018 at 00:00 hours.

Programming
 Rhythm & Rox
 Streaming Now
 Trending Now
Spiderman

References 

Sony Pictures Networks India
Television channels and stations established in 2017
Defunct television channels in India
Television channels and stations disestablished in 2018